One is a radio comedy series created by David Quantick.  It was broadcast on BBC Radio 4 and BBC Radio 4 Extra. Each episode lasts 15 minutes and consists of a series of vignettes, each of which features only a single voice.

Subjects
The style and subject matter of the vignettes is varied, but some themes recur.
 Unusual messages recorded on answering machines.
 Readings of notes found in a guest book at a vacation home, featuring bizarre complaints.
 Audio guides to museums that have obscure or bizarre exhibits.
 Parodies of commentaries in the style of well-known personalities, sometimes read by the personalities themselves, such as Jeremy Clarkson reading "Top Dog", or bird expert Bill Oddie describing, in the style of a nature documentary, a typical encounter between Wile E. Coyote and the Road Runner.
 Recitations of ideas such as personal crises, bad moods, T-shirt slogans etc., in the style of the Shipping Forecast. For example:
"And now with the time approaching 5 pm,
It's time for the mid-life crisis forecast...

Forties; restless: three or four.
Marriage: stale; becoming suffocating.
Sportscar, jeans and t-shirt; westerly, five.
Waitress; blonde; 19 or 20.
Converse all stars; haircut; earring; children;
becoming embarrassed.
Tail between legs; atmosphere frosty;
Spare room: five or six."

Performers
Performers include Graeme Garden, Dan Antopolski, Simon Greenall, Lizzie Roper, and Deborah Norton.  Those appearing as themselves include Jeremy Clarkson and Bill Oddie.

References

BBC Radio comedy programmes
BBC Radio 4 programmes